Sebastián Rodríguez de Villaviciosa (Tordesillas, Valladolid, c. 1618 - 1663), was a Spanish playwright of the Siglo de Oro.

References

1618 births
1663 deaths